Jeremías is the 1st album by British-Venezuelan singer-songwriter Jeremías released in 2003, Arreglado, Producido y Dirigido por: Luis Romero.

Track listing
 Poco a Poco
 Desde El Bar
 Tu En Mi
 Lo Que Yo Quiero
 Corazón Sin Freno
 Dormida
 La Cita
 Como Quieres Tu Que Te Diga
 Porque Me Duele
 Arriba Mamita

2003 albums
Jeremías albums